Raquel Kops-Jones and Abigail Spears were the defenders of championship title, but Kops-Jones chose to participate in Rome instead and Spears chose not to play.
Sorana Cîrstea and Anabel Medina Garrigues won in the final 6–1, 7–5, against Vitalia Diatchenko and Aurélie Védy.

Seeds

Draw

Draw

References
 Doubles Draw

Estoril Open - Doubles
Portugal Open
Estoril Open - Women's Doubles, 2010